Lekima may refer to:
Typhoon Lekima, the name of four tropical cyclones in the Pacific Ocean
 A common name for Pouteria campechiana, an evergreen tree